Tillandsia arequitae is a species of flowering plant in the Bromeliaceae family. It is native to Brazil and Uruguay, its specific epithet referring to Cerro Arequita, Lavalleja Department in Uruguay.

Cultivars
 Tillandsia 'Mystic Rainbow'
 Tillandsia 'Mystic Rainbow Peach'
 Tillandsia 'Mystic Rainbow Pink'

References

External links
 
 BSI Cultivar Registry, retrieved 11 October 2009

arequitae
Flora of Brazil
Flora of Uruguay
Plants described in 1893
Taxa named by Carl Christian Mez
Taxa named by Édouard André